Édouard Bihouée (born 6 April 1936) is a French former professional racing cyclist. He rode in the 1960, 1961 and 1962 Tour de France.

References

External links
 

1936 births
Living people
French male cyclists
Sportspeople from Nord (French department)
Cyclists from Hauts-de-France